Les Poissons rouges ou Mon père ce héros is a play by French dramatist Jean Anouilh. It premiered at the Théâtre de l'Œuvre on 21 January 1970.

Original cast and characters
 Jean-Pierre Marielle : Antoine de Saint-Flour
 Michel Galabru : La Surette
 Yvonne Clech : Charlotte de Saint-Flour
 Marie-Claire Chantraine : Edwiga Pataques
 Claude Stermann : Toto de Saint-Flour
 Lyne Chardonnet : Camomille de Saint-Flour
 Madeleine Barbulée : Mme Prudent
 Nicole Vassel : Adèle/la voix du bébé
 Pascal Mazzotti : médecin bossu
 Edith Perret : dame
 Marcelle Arnold : dame
 Gilberte Géniat : bonne de l'auberge de la mer/couturière.

References

Plays by Jean Anouilh
1970 plays